Matthias Hafenreffer (24 June 1561  22 October 1619) was a German orthodox Lutheran theologian in the Lutheran scholastic tradition.

Born at Lorch (Württemberg), Hafenreffer was professor at Tübingen from 1592 until his death in 1617. He was a motivating teacher with a charismatic influence upon his students. He combined strict faithfulness to the Book of Concord with a peaceful disposition. Among those who enjoyed his instruction and correspondence was the astronomer Johannes Kepler. His chief work was his system of doctrine under the title Loci Theologici (1600).  He died in Tübingen, aged 58.

References
Jacobs, Henry Eyster. “Hafenreffer, Matthias.” Lutheran Cyclopedia. New York: Scribner, 1899. p. 209.

1561 births
1619 deaths
People from Lorch (Württemberg)
16th-century Latin-language writers
German Lutheran theologians
Johannes Kepler
17th-century German Protestant theologians
German male non-fiction writers
17th-century German writers
17th-century German male writers
16th-century Lutheran theologians
17th-century Lutheran theologians